Marina Timofeieva (born 24 February 1984 in Tallinn) is an Estonian ice dancer. With partner Evgeni Striganov, she is the 2003 & 2004 Estonian national champion. They were five time competitors at the World Junior Figure Skating Championships, with the highest placement of 17th in 2003. They placed 22nd at the 2003 European Figure Skating Championships and 26th at the 2003 World Figure Skating Championships. They were coached by Lea Rand, the mother of fellow Estonian ice dancers Kristjan and Taavi Rand.

References

External links
 Tracings.net profile

Estonian female ice dancers
Figure skaters from Tallinn
Living people
1984 births
Estonian people of Russian descent